"Dive" is a song by English singer-songwriter Ed Sheeran. It was included on his third studio album ÷ (2017). It is the third track on the album. After the album's release, it charted at number 8 on the UK Singles Chart.

Background
Sheeran wrote the song with Benny Blanco and Julia Michaels. In an interview with Zane Lowe, Sheeran said that he, Blanco and Michaels started working on the song in Malibu in March 2016 just before he left for a break in Japan.  He had the riffs for the song, and first put down five or six riffs, and Michaels then sang 10 or 15 seconds on each. Later, after Sheeran had come back and reviewed the recordings, Michaels returned to flesh out the song with Sheeran and Blanco.

Jessie Ware provides backing vocal on this as well as two other songs on the album.  The guitar solo in the song is credited to an anonymous guitarist named Angelo Mysterioso, and Sheeran revealed that he himself was also credited as Angelo Mysterioso in the guitarist's album (an individual of that name was credited on an Eric Clapton song, "I Will Be There", and Sheeran had performed the song with Clapton in concert).

Critical reception
Taylor Weatherby of Billboard described the song as the one with the "most passionate vocal strains" of the album.

Live performances
Sheeran performed the song with American country singer Luke Combs on 13 March, 2022, at the C2C: Country to Country festival in London. Combs previously covered the song as an exclusive for Spotify in 2018.

Charts

Weekly charts

Year-end charts

Certifications

References

2016 songs
Ed Sheeran songs
Songs written by Ed Sheeran
Songs written by Benny Blanco
Songs written by Julia Michaels
Song recordings produced by Benny Blanco